Julia Davis Park is a municipal park in the western United States, located in the downtown region of Boise, Idaho. Created in 1907 with a land donation from Thomas Jefferson Davis, it is the first park in the "String of Pearls", a series of parks along the Boise River operated by the city's Parks and Recreation Department.

Being centrally located in Boise, the park contains several prominent sites, including museums such as the Boise Art Museum, the Idaho Historical Museum, and the Idaho Black History Museum, as well as other attractions like Zoo Boise, the Idaho Rose Society, and the Gene Harris Band Shell. The Boise River Greenbelt runs through the park, which is bordered by Broadway Avenue to the east, Capital Boulevard to the west, the Boise River to the south, and Myrtle Street to the north. Other amenities at Julia Davis Park include river access, statues, a rose garden, a playground and tennis court, a pond with paddle boat rentals, and a pedestrian bridge that connects the park to Boise State University.

History
Julia Davis Park has its roots in the 1862 journey of two orphans, Thomas and Frank Davis, who traveled to the Boise area from Cincinnati, Ohio, with hopes of joining in the widely publicized gold rush in the Idaho Territory. The brothers staked a claim and mined for a year, before building a cabin in 1863 on the Cottonwood Creek near the site of the present Julia Davis Park. On July 4, 1863, Fort Boise was established and shortly after, the Davis brothers along with seven friends met in the Davis' cabin and planned the formation of the City of Boise. According to one of the friends, William Lowery Ritchie, “in the summer of 1863 the soldiers came and established the garrison; that was sometime early in July. It was about that time we met in our cabin and formed a town co.”  Thomas Davis came to play a pivotal role in the development of Boise as a city and sought to help attract visitors and pioneers to the valley. With his mining claim being less than profitable, Davis turned to the promotion of agriculture by planting 7,000 apple trees on his land along the Boise River. Within several years, Davis went on to purchase the first water rights in the valley, as well as an additional  from the federal government along the foothills and where the town of Garden City was developed. In 1871, Davis married Julia McCrumb, who had travelled to Boise from Ontario, Canada, to visit family in 1869.

Near the end of the century, in 1899, the Davis couple offered a section of their orchard lands for use as a park, but the city was hesitant to act on this offer. They again offered a deed for a park in February 1907. Finally, after the death of Julia Davis in September, presumably from typhoid, the city paid one dollar to Thomas Davis as he deeded  acres of land to the city in memory of his wife in November 1907. He required that the land be utilized for public purposes and that the park would be “always and forever” known as Julia Davis Park. Davis enforced this by including in the deed a stipulation that the land would return to the Davis heirs if the property were ever used for any other purpose. The next year, in 1908, Davis died the morning after a much anticipated Damrosch concert. His death was a sad event to the many Boiseans who attended the funeral and respected the couple's philanthropy.

In the decade following Davis's death, the city worked to improve the park and upgrade the land by adding walls, planting vegetation, and creating a general development plan with the help of Arthur L. Peck in 1912. In 1916, the Boise Zoo, now known as Zoo Boise, was created when a monkey was found in the desert near Mountain Home. During the next decade, the park expanded with a series of land donations from the Davis estate in 1922, 1929, 1931, and 1932. During this time, a bandshell was built in the park in 1928, and the Boise Zoo expanded in 1929. In 1931, the Morrison-Knudsen Company built the Capitol Boulevard Memorial Bridge next to Julia Davis Park. As the economy improved following the Great Depression, Julia Davis Park saw the dedication of a rose garden in 1939, and the expansion of the park to its current borders from Capitol Boulevard to Broadway Avenue in 1940 and 1941.

Meat rationing as a result of World War II occurred also in 1941, which put away meat-eating animals in Zoo Boise. In 1950, the Idaho Historical Museum was established on the park grounds, and Union Pacific donated Engine 2195, called "Big Mike", to Julia Davis Park in 1959. In 1966, the city began developing the Boise River Greenbelt, and in 1972, the Boise Gallery of Art underwent an expansion. The Bob Gibb Friendship Bridge was built to connect the greenbelt, as well as the park, with Boise State University across the river in 1980. The Idaho Historical Museum grew in 1982, and in 1986, the Gallery of Art was renamed the Boise Art Museum during a renovation. A year later, the Idaho Black History Museum was established in the Old St. Baptist Church in 1998. In 2002, Jerry Snodgrass created a statue memorializing pioneers to the Boise area such as Julia Davis. A century after the park was established, a Centennial Celebration took place on June 23, 2007, and the city began a “Second Century” campaign to improve the park.

Idaho Black History Museum

Nestled next to the historic Julia Davis Park lies the Idaho Black History Museum. Built in 1995, the museum is the oldest black history museum in the Pacific Northwest. Being so, the museum, as well as Julia Davis Park, proves Idaho's rich foundation of history, diversity, and “reinvention”. Contributing activities, events, and information, the Idaho Black History Museum is a vital contributor to Julia Davis Park and all of Boise.

Zoo Boise
In 1916, a circus traveled through Mountain Home. During the stop, a monkey escaped from captivity and was finally found in the Mountain Home Desert, long past the circus's departure. Boise being the home for the newfound monkey, a Boise Zoo was then founded. Zoo Boise draws many visitors to Julia Davis Park. In 2008, Zoo Boise opened a $2.8 Million African Plains exhibit which includes a new African Village, three small exhibit areas (housing rock hyrax, weaver birds, and lemurs), and two large exhibit areas (housing African lions, striped hyenas, giraffes, zebras, amur leopard, snow leopard, penguins, red pandas, and tigers). A Primate Building as well as an aviary stands between these two exhibits.

In 2018 construction started on a 3 acre expansion focusing on Gorongosa National Park in Mozambique, bringing the zoo total acreage of exhibits to be close to 17.   The new exhibit opened in the summer of 2019 and includes the addition of olive baboons, African painted dogs, vervet monkeys, crocodiles, warthogs and more. In addition, the old primate house near the front of the zoo and buildings around that were demolished and a modern new plaza with exhibits for gibbons and sarus cranes were constructed. Since the new exhibits opened the zoo has seen attendance of 350,000 plus.  

Zoo Boise is home to the Zoo Boise Conservation fund administered by Friends of Zoo Boise. In the past decade, the fund has contributed over $3 million dollars to conservation locally and globally, including a variety of projects in Mozambique, locally in and around Boise and throughout Asia and Central America. Each year, the zoo contributes more than 10% of all of its revenue to conservation.

Rose Gardens 

The addition of a rose garden to the park originated with H.C. Schuppel in 1935, a chairman of a rose garden club called the "Cut Worms." Work on the project began in earnest in 1939 with a total of 2800 roses planted (some from Villa Nurseries in Portland, Oregon). It was also in this year that the Rose Garden was officially dedicated. A key development came later in 1979 with the establishment of the Memorial Rose Fund. This fund was intended to help create memorials in the garden for friends and family members. National recognition was given to the Rose Garden in 1992 when it received its Public Rose Garden accreditation. As a result of this, 10 bushes of All American winners are given to the Garden yearly. The Garden is also often the site of wedding ceremonies.

Idaho State Historical Museum
The Idaho State Historical Museum, founded in 1907, is operated by the Idaho State Historical Society. It contains exhibits on Native American, Basque, and Chinese culture.

Discovery Center of Idaho
Next to Julia Davis' pond lies the Discovery Center of Idaho, completed in 1988. Its stated mission is to inspire lifelong interest and learning in science, technology, engineering and math.

Boise Art Museum

Founded in 1931 as Idaho's premier art association, the Boise Art Museum provides an epicenter for Boise's art scene. Along Julia Davis Park, the BAM organizes the appearance of fine art that would otherwise pass from the community’s eyes. Each year, with assistance from Boise's local art scene, cooperative government, and the Idaho Parks and Recreation Department, the Boise Art Museum hosts “Art in the Park,” an event which brings together Boise's art scene and locally owned businesses.

Bandshell
Located inside of Julia Davis Park is the Gene Harris Bandshell. Playing multiple free concerts for the park visitors and bringing musical culture to the people, the Gene Harris bandshell was initially built in 1928 and dedicated to Gene Harris in 2001. The Velvet Underground, the Wailers, and Pete Seeger have performed at the Bandshell.

Future plans

Projects underway in Julia Davis Park include a new “Grand Plaza” for large events and gatherings, a history walk amongst several new pavilions, the addition of four new river nodes, and a new “Golden Apple” interactive history tour. The Grand Plaza is planned to take the form of a broken circle centered on a bronze medallion inset into the pavement and is intended to provide social and operational space. Five new or refurbished pavilions will be built to provide a picnic area, concert center, and gathering space. Each of the five river nodes is intended to bring out the beauty and reflective nature of Boise's wildlife, brush, and river. The nodes will be centered on a pedestal made of stained steel and copper and will have information on the park's history. There will be a history walk linking the different sites with historical information, and a “Quest for the Golden Apple” which will have thirteen stops with information on Idaho history and nature.

Gallery

See also
 List of parks in Boise

References

External links 

 City of Boise Parks and Recreation
 Julia Davis Park: The Second Century
 Idaho Black History Museum
 Zoo Boise
 Idaho State History Museum
 Discovery Center of Idaho
 Boise Art Museum

Parks in Idaho
Geography of Boise, Idaho
Protected areas of Ada County, Idaho
Tourist attractions in Boise, Idaho
1907 establishments in Idaho
Boise State University
African-American museums in Idaho